The villa La Reine Jeanne is an imposing holiday mansion, built in 1928 by the American architect Barry Dierks for the French industrialist Paul-Louis Weiller.

It is renowned for having received numerous celebrities, stars, writers, monarchs, and heads of state, among whom Charlie Chaplin, Richard Nixon, King Juan Carlos of Spain, and Georges Pompidou are noted.

History
In the mid-1920s, while searching for a place to build his summer home, Paul-Louis Weiller explored the French Riviera at the controls of an airplane.  He discovered the site, located on the pointe de la Galère in the village of Cabasson at Bormes-les-Mimosas.

In 1928, Weiller commissioned Barry Dierks to build on the site a Modernist villa capable of accommodating 30 guests.

Until the year before his death in 1993, Weiller continued to receive at the villa La Reine Jeanne international dignitaries from the world of politics, arts and letters, as well as industrialists and giants of the financial world.  During the summer of 1969, President Georges Pompidou, who was vacationing at the Fort de Brégançon, was a regular guest at his neighbor's dinner table.

Likewise, Grand Duke Jean of Luxembourg, who owned the adjoining villa, La Tour sarrasine, was a frequent guest.  It was at Cabosson that Weiller's granddaughter, Sibilla, met Prince Guillaume of Luxembourg, youngest son of the Grand Duke.  The two were married in 1994.

Notable guests 
Among those notables invited to the villa were:

Notes and references

See also

See also 
 Paul-Louis Weiller
 Barry Dierks
 Bormes-les-Mimosas

Modernist architecture in France
French Riviera
Houses completed in 1928
La Reine Jeanne
Buildings and structures in Var (department)
20th-century architecture in France